The Warrior Ridge Dam and Hydroelectric Plant is a historic dam and power plant and national historic district spanning the Frankstown Branch Juniata River and located in Logan Township and Porter Township in Huntingdon County, Pennsylvania. The district includes 5 contributing buildings and 3 contributing structures. They are the main dam, power plant, auxiliary dam, and four houses and a former church in the operators village. The power plant was constructed in 1906–1907, and measured , with a steam plant and two wings. The power plant was partially demolished in 1978. The houses and former church were built by plant developer, the Junuata Hydro-Electric Company of Philadelphia.

It was listed on the National Register of Historic Places in 1990.

References

External links

Categories correctly located on the dam redirect -->

Buildings and structures in Huntingdon County, Pennsylvania
Industrial buildings and structures on the National Register of Historic Places in Pennsylvania
Historic American Engineering Record in Pennsylvania
Historic districts on the National Register of Historic Places in Pennsylvania
Dams completed in 1907
National Register of Historic Places in Huntingdon County, Pennsylvania
Dams on the National Register of Historic Places in Pennsylvania
Energy infrastructure on the National Register of Historic Places
1907 establishments in Pennsylvania